The 1997 FIFA World Youth Championship, known as the 1997 FIFA/Coca-Cola World Youth Championship for sponsorship purposes, was the 11th staging of the FIFA World Youth Championship. It was held from 16 June to 5 July 1997 in Malaysia. It was the first FIFA tournament hosted by a Southeast Asian country.

Venues

Qualification 
The following 24 teams qualified for the 1997 FIFA World Youth Championship. Host Malaysia did not have to qualify for the tournament.

1.Teams that made their debut.

Squads 
For a list of all squads that played in the final tournament, see 1997 FIFA World Youth Championship squads

Group stages 
The 24 teams were split into six groups of four teams. Six group winners, six-second-place finishers and the four best third-place finishers qualify for the knockout round.

Group A

Group B

Group C

Group D

Group E

Group F

Ranking of third-placed teams

Knockout stage

Round of 16

Quarter-finals

Semi-finals

Third place play-off

Final

Result

Awards

Goalscorers 

Adaílton of Brazil won the Golden Shoe award for scoring ten goals. In total, 165 goals were scored by 101 different players, with seven of them credited as own goals.

10 goals
  Adaílton
5 goals
  David Trezeguet
4 goals

  Bernardo Romeo
  Juan Román Riquelme
  Kostas Salapasidis
  Alex
  Atsushi Yanagisawa
  Marcelo Zalayeta

3 goals

  Gunter Van Handenhoven
  Zé Elias
  Danny Murphy
  Michael Owen
  Thierry Henry
  Eduardo Lillingston
  José Luis Deus
  Fabián Coelho

2 goals

  Lionel Scaloni
  Álvaro
  Fernandão
  Rôni
  Peter Luccin
  Baba Sule
  Peter Ofori-Quaye
  Harutaka Ono
  Shinji Jojo
  Damien Duff
  Micky Cummins
  Trevor Molloy
  Junaid Hartley
  Park Jin-sub
  Alberto Rivera
  Javier Farinós
  Nicolás Olivera

1 goal

  Diego Placente
  Diego Quintana
  Esteban Cambiasso
  Martín Perezlindo
  Pablo Aimar
  Daniel Allsopp
  Éder Gaúcho
  Gauthier Remacle
  Dwayne De Rosario
  Jason Bent
  Steve Kindel
  Li Jinyu
  Wang Peng
  Alonso Solís
  Froylán Ledezma
  Steven Bryce
  Jamie Carragher
  Paul Shepherd
  Awudu Issaka
  Bashiru Gambo
  Joseph Ansah
  Mohamed Mouktar
  Odartey Lawson
  Richard Ackon
  Stephen Appiah
  Attila Szili
  Serge Dié
  Souleymane Cisse
  Kenji Fukuda
  Nozomi Hiroyama
  Shunsuke Nakamura
  Yuichiro Nagai
  Nik Ahmad Fadly Nik Leh
  Carlos Cariño
  Gerardo Torres
  Omar Santacruz
  Aissam El Barodi
  Hamid Termina
  Khalid Khamma
  Tarik Sektioui
  César Cáceres
  Gustavo Morinigo
  Juan Samudio
  Paulo da Silva
  Raúl Román
  Desmond Baker
  Neale Fenn
  Chung Seok-keun
  Lee Jung-min
  Lee Kwan-woo
  David Albelda
  Diego Ribera
  Miguel Ángel Angulo
  Mohamed Kazim
  Yaser Salem Ali
  Brian West
  Jorge Flores
  Álvaro Perea
  Rodrigo López
  Inti Podestá
  Pablo García

Own goal

  Mikaël Silvestre (playing against Brazil)
  Khairun Haled Masrom (playing against Uruguay)
  Youssef Safri (playing against Malaysia)
  Niall Inman (playing against Morocco)
  Abdulla Ahmed Abdulla (playing against England)
  Ramiro Corrales (playing against Republic of Ireland)
  Alejandro Meloño (playing against Ghana)

Final ranking

Notes

External links 

 FIFA World Youth Championship Malaysia 1997 , FIFA.com
 RSSSF > FIFA World Youth Championship > 1997
 FIFA Technical Report (Part 1), (Part 2), (Part 3) and (Part 4)

Fifa World Youth Championship, 1997
FIFA
FIFA World Youth Championship
International association football competitions hosted by Malaysia
FIFA World Youth Championship
FIFA World Youth Championship